The Internazionali di Tennis Castel del Monte is a tennis tournament held in Andria, Italy since 2013. The event is part of the ATP Challenger Tour and is played on indoor carpet courts.

Past finals

Singles

Doubles

External links
 Official website

 
ATP Challenger Tour
Tennis tournaments in Italy
Carpet court tennis tournaments
Recurring sporting events established in 2013